"Masterpiece" is a 1992 song written by Kenny Nolan and performed by Atlantic Starr. The single was the second release from the album Love Crazy and peaked at number three on the US Billboard Hot R&B Singles chart. "Masterpiece" also went to number three on the Hot 100 and number two on the Hot Adult Contemporary chart. The song performed well in Canada, peaking at number 15 on the RPM Top Singles chart and number one on the RPM Adult Contemporary chart.

Background
Nolan has stated that "Masterpiece" is his favorite of all of his compositions, whether among his own hits or those of others.

Charts

Weekly charts

Year-end charts

Other Language Versions
Cantonese lyrics were substituted in the song 妳是我的太陽 sung by Hacken Lee.  The song was used as the sub theme of the Hong Kong TVB Television Series "他來自天堂" (Angel's Call).

References

External links
 Lyrics of this song
 

1991 singles
Songs written by Kenny Nolan
Atlantic Starr songs
Contemporary R&B ballads
Pop ballads
1991 songs
Reprise Records singles
1990s ballads